Seoul Searching is a 2016 South Korean comedy-drama film written and directed by Benson Lee and starring Justin Chon, Jessika Van, Cha In-Pyo and Teo Yoo.

Premise 
Seoul, 1986. A raucous gaggle of Korean teenagers spill out of the Gimpo airport and onto buses that transport them to a location just outside the city. There, these high schoolers sent from all over the world—the U.S., Mexico, London, and Hamburg—are participating in a government-sponsored summer program to help them connect with their heritage. With a summer of partying ahead of them, they're on a crash course to bring shame to their families, their ancestors, and their hosts—but with any luck, they might just figure out how to make friends, fall in love, and absorb some of their roots along the way. (Sundance Institute)

Cast
Justin Chon as Sid Park
Jessika Van as Grace Park
Cha In-pyo as Mr. Kim
Teo Yoo as Klaus Kim
Esteban Ahn as Sergio Kim
Rosalina Leigh as Kris Schultz
Albert Kong as Mike Song
Han Hee-jun as Chow
Crystal Kay as Jamie
Nekhebet Kum Juch as Jackie Im
Uatchet Jin Juch as Judy Im
Sue Son as Sara Han
Gwi-hwa Choi as Mr. Chae 
Kang Byul as Sue-jin Song
Kim Wan-sun as Kim Wan-sun Wannabe
Park Hyung-soo as Gangster

Release
The film made its worldwide premiere at the Sundance Film Festival in January 2015.

The film was then released in theaters in New York City on June 17, 2016.  It was also released in theaters in Los Angeles on June 24, 2016.  The film was also shown at the Regal Medlock Crossing 18 in Johns Creek, Georgia from August 5 to August 11 of 2016.

Netflix acquired the streaming rights of the movie in Winter 2016 and released it December 2017 worldwide. It has been dubbed and/or subtitled in over 15 languages.

Reception
Since its release in December 2017 on Netflix, the film has topped over 30 the "Best of Netflix" lists and in 2021 alone it topped the "Best of Netflix" lists in over 10 publications including: PopSugar, OprahDaily.comOprah Magazine, Town & Country (magazine), Seventeen (American magazine), Teen Vogue

The film has a 75% rating on Rotten Tomatoes.  Nick Allen of RogerEbert.com awarded the film three stars.  Stephanie Merry of The Washington Post gave it two stars out of four.  Timothy Tau of IndieWire graded the film an A−.

The New York Times gave it a "NYT Critics Pick" in 2016.

Justin Chang of Variety gave the film a positive review and wrote, "A unique portrait of the Korean immigrant experience distinguishes writer-director Benson Lee's messy but endearing '80s-set comedy."

Josh Terry of Deseret News gave it a negative review and wrote, "In better hands, Seoul Searching might have been a nice balance of ’80s nostalgia and sincere coming of age. Unfortunately, what we have here is a missed opportunity."

Justin Lowe of The Hollywood Reporter gave it a positive review and wrote, "Lee’s most accessible film yet looks poised to capitalize on enduring 80s nostalgia and a refreshingly appealing premise that could see the film crossing over from niche bookings to much broader appeal."

The movie was the first mainstream feature to highlight the Korean adoptee experience and diaspora in America. The film became a flagship movie for Korean adoptees which director Benson Lee said he included as they were part of the diaspora Korean adoptees experienced in their respective countries.

References

External links
 
 

2010s English-language films
2010s Korean-language films
2010s German-language films
Films about Korean Americans
English-language South Korean films
American comedy-drama films
Chinese comedy-drama films
South Korean comedy-drama films
2015 comedy-drama films
Bowery Hills Entertainment films
2010s American films
2010s South Korean films